Fahad (also known as Beyt-e Ka‘b-e ‘Omar) is a village in Seyyed Abbas Rural District, Shavur District, Shush County, Khuzestan Province, Iran. At the 2006 census, its population was 560, in 99 families.

References 

Populated places in Shush County